Abbie Joe is a ghost town in Beauregard Parish, Louisiana, United States.

Populated places in Beauregard Parish, Louisiana
Ghost towns in Louisiana